Control rods are used in nuclear reactors to control the rate of fission of the nuclear fuel – uranium or plutonium.  Their compositions include chemical elements such as boron, cadmium, silver, hafnium, or indium, that are capable of absorbing many neutrons without themselves decaying. These elements have different neutron capture cross sections for neutrons of various energies. Boiling water reactors (BWR), pressurized water reactors (PWR), and heavy-water reactors (HWR) operate with thermal neutrons, while breeder reactors operate with fast neutrons. Each reactor design can use different control rod materials based on the energy spectrum of its neutrons.  Control rods have been used in nuclear aircraft engines like Project Pluto as a method of control.

Operating principle

Control rods are inserted into the core of a nuclear reactor and adjusted in order to control the rate of the nuclear chain reaction and, thereby, the thermal power output of the reactor, the rate of steam production, and the electrical power output of the power station.

The number of control rods inserted, and the distance to which they are inserted, strongly influence the reactivity of the reactor. When reactivity (as effective neutron multiplication factor) is above 1, the rate of the nuclear chain reaction increases exponentially over time. When reactivity is below 1, the rate of the reaction decreases exponentially over time. When all control rods are fully inserted, they keep reactivity barely above 0, which quickly slows a running reactor to a stop and keeps it stopped (in shutdown). If all control rods are fully removed, reactivity is significantly above 1, and the reactor quickly runs hotter and hotter, until some other factor (such as temperature reactivity feedback) slows the reaction rate. Maintaining a constant power output requires keeping the long-term average neutron multiplication factor close to 1.

A new reactor is assembled with its control rods fully inserted. Control rods are partially removed from the core to allow the nuclear chain reaction to start up and increase to the desired power level. Neutron flux can be measured, and is roughly proportional to reaction rate and power level. To increase power output, some control rods are pulled out a small distance for a while. To decrease power output, some control rods are pushed in a small distance for a while. Several other factors affect the reactivity; to compensate for them, an automatic control system adjusts the control rods small amounts in or out, as-needed in some reactors. Each control rod influences some part of the reactor more than others; calculated adjustments to fuel distribution can be made to maintain similar reaction rates and temperatures in different parts of the core.

Typical shutdown time for modern reactors such as the European Pressurized Reactor or Advanced CANDU reactor is two seconds for 90% reduction, limited by decay heat.

Control rods are usually used in control rod assemblies (typically 20 rods for a commercial PWR assembly) and inserted into guide tubes within the fuel elements. Control rods often stand vertically within the core. In PWRs they are inserted from above, with the control rod drive mechanisms mounted on the reactor pressure vessel head. In BWRs, due to the necessity of a steam dryer above the core, this design requires insertion of the control rods from beneath.

Materials

Chemical elements with usefully high neutron capture cross-sections include silver, indium, and cadmium. Other candidate elements include boron, cobalt, hafnium, samarium, europium, gadolinium, terbium, dysprosium, holmium, erbium, thulium, ytterbium, and lutetium. Alloys or compounds may also be used, such as high-boron steel, silver-indium-cadmium alloy, boron carbide, zirconium diboride, titanium diboride, hafnium diboride, gadolinium nitrate, gadolinium titanate, dysprosium titanate, and boron carbide–europium hexaboride composite.

The material choice is influenced by the neutron energy in the reactor, their resistance to neutron-induced swelling, and the required mechanical and lifespan properties. The rods may have the form of tubes filled with neutron-absorbing pellets or powder. The tubes can be made of stainless steel or other "neutron window" materials such as zirconium, chromium, silicon carbide, or cubic  (cubic boron nitride).

The burnup of "burnable poison" isotopes also limits lifespan of a control rod. They may be reduced by using an element such as hafnium, a "non-burnable poison" which captures multiple neutrons before losing effectiveness, or by not using neutron absorbers for trimming. For example, in pebble bed reactors or in possible new type lithium-7-moderated and -cooled reactors that use fuel and absorber pebbles.

Some rare-earth elements are excellent neutron absorbers and are more common than silver (reserves of about 500,000t). For example, ytterbium (reserves about one M tons) and yttrium, 400 times more common, with middle capturing values, can be found and used together without separation inside minerals like xenotime (Yb) (Yb0.40Y0.27Lu0.12Er0.12Dy0.05Tm0.04Ho0.01)PO4, or keiviite (Yb) (Yb1.43Lu0.23Er0.17Tm0.08Y0.05Dy0.03Ho0.02)2Si2O7, lowering the cost. Xenon is also a strong neutron absorber as a gas, and can be used for controlling and (emergency) stopping helium-cooled reactors, but does not function in cases of pressure loss, or as a burning protection gas together with argon around the vessel part especially in case of core catching reactors or if filled with sodium or lithium. Fission-produced xenon can be used after waiting for caesium to precipitate, when practically no radioactivity is left. Cobalt-59 is also used as an absorber for winning of cobalt-60 for X-ray production. Control rods can also be constructed as thick turnable rods with a tungsten reflector and absorber side turned to stop by a spring in less than one second.

Silver-indium-cadmium alloys, generally 80% Ag, 15% In, and 5% Cd, are a common control rod material for pressurized water reactors. The somewhat different energy absorption regions of the materials make the alloy an excellent neutron absorber. It has good mechanical strength and can be easily fabricated. It must be encased in stainless steel to prevent corrosion in hot water. Although indium is less rare than silver, it is more expensive.

Boron is another common neutron absorber. Due to the different cross sections of 10B and 11B, materials containing boron enriched in 10B by isotopic separation are frequently used. The wide absorption spectrum of boron also makes it suitable as a neutron shield. The mechanical properties of boron in its elementary form are unsuitable, and therefore alloys or compounds have to be used instead. Common choices are high-boron steel and boron carbide. The latter is used as a control rod material in both PWRs and BWRs. 10B/11B separation is done commercially with gas centrifuges over BF3, but can also be done over BH3 from borane production or directly with an energy optimized melting centrifuge, using the heat of freshly separated boron for preheating.

Hafnium has excellent properties for reactors using water for both moderation and cooling. It has good mechanical strength, can be easily fabricated, and is resistant to corrosion in hot water. Hafnium can be alloyed with other elements, e.g. with tin and oxygen to increase tensile and creep strength, with iron, chromium, and niobium for corrosion resistance, and with molybdenum for wear resistance, hardness, and machineability. Such alloys are designated as Hafaloy, Hafaloy-M, Hafaloy-N, and Hafaloy-NM. The high cost and low availability of hafnium limit its use in civilian reactors, although it is used in some US Navy reactors. Hafnium carbide can also be used as an insoluble material with a high melting point of 3890 °C and density higher than that of uranium dioxide for sinking, unmelted, through corium.

Dysprosium titanate was undergoing evaluation for pressurized water control rods. Dysprosium titanate is a promising replacement for Ag-In-Cd alloys because it has a much higher melting point, does not tend to react with cladding materials, is easy to produce, does not produce radioactive waste, does not swell and does not outgas. It was developed in Russia and is recommended by some for VVER and RBMK reactors. A disadvantage is less titanium and oxide absorption, that other neutron absorbing elements do not react with the already high-melting point cladding materials and that just using the unseparated content with dysprosium inside of minerals like Keiviit Yb inside chromium, SiC or c11B15N tubes deliver superior price and absorption without swelling and outgassing.

Hafnium diboride is another such material. It can be used alone or in a sintered mixture of hafnium and boron carbide powders.

Many other compounds of rare-earth elements can be used, such as samarium with boron-like europium and samarium boride, which is already used in the colour industry. Less absorptive compounds of boron similar to titanium, but inexpensive, such as molybdenum as Mo2B5. Since they all swell with boron, in practice other compounds are better, such as carbides, etc., or compounds with two or more neutron-absorbing elements together. It is important that tungsten, and probably also other elements like tantalum, have much the same high capture qualities as hafnium, but with the opposite effect. This is not explainable by neutron reflection alone. An obvious explanation is resonance gamma rays increasing the fission and breeding ratio versus causing more capture of uranium, etc. over metastable conditions like for isotope 235mU, which has a half-life of about 26 min.

Additional means of reactivity regulation
Other means of controlling reactivity include (for PWR) a soluble neutron absorber (boric acid) added to the reactor coolant, allowing the complete extraction of the control rods during stationary power operation, ensuring an even power and flux distribution over the entire core. This chemical shim, along with the use of burnable neutron poisons within the fuel pellets, is used to assist regulation of the core's long term reactivity, while the control rods are used for rapid reactor power changes (e.g. shutdown and start up). Operators of BWRs use the coolant flow through the core to control reactivity by varying the speed of the reactor recirculation pumps (an increase in coolant flow through the core improves the removal of steam bubbles, thus increasing the density of the coolant/moderator, increasing power).

Safety
In most reactor designs, as a safety measure, control rods are attached to the lifting machinery by electromagnets, rather than direct mechanical linkage. This means that in the event of power failure, or if manually invoked due to failure of the lifting machinery, the control rods fall automatically, under gravity, all the way into the pile to stop the reaction. A notable exception to this fail-safe mode of operation is the BWR, which requires hydraulic insertion in the event of an emergency shut-down, using water from a special tank under high pressure. Quickly shutting down a reactor in this way is called scramming.

Criticality accident prevention
Mismanagement or control rod failure have often been blamed for nuclear accidents, including the SL-1 explosion and the Chernobyl disaster.
Homogeneous neutron absorbers have often been used to manage criticality accidents which involve aqueous solutions of fissile metals. In several such accidents, either borax (sodium borate) or a cadmium compound has been added to the system. The cadmium can be added as a metal to nitric acid solutions of fissile material; the corrosion of the cadmium in the acid will then generate cadmium nitrate in situ.

In carbon dioxide-cooled reactors such as the AGR, if the solid control rods fail to arrest the nuclear reaction, nitrogen gas can be injected into the primary coolant cycle. This is because nitrogen has a larger absorption cross-section for neutrons than carbon or oxygen; hence, the core then becomes less reactive.

As the neutron energy increases, the neutron cross section of most isotopes decreases. The boron isotope 10B is responsible for the majority of the neutron absorption. Boron-containing materials can also be used as neutron shielding, to reduce the activation of material close to a reactor core.

See also
Nuclear power
Nuclear reactor
Nuclear safety
Wigner effect

Notes

References

External links

Further reading

Alloys
Nuclear power plant components
Nuclear reactor safety
Pressurized water reactors